Francesco Favasuli (born 24 August 1983) is an Italian football midfielder.

Appearances on Italian Series 

Serie B : 17 Apps, 1 Goal

Serie C1 : 138 Apps, 16 Goals

Serie D : 25 Apps, 3 Goals

Total : 180 Apps, 20 Goals

References 
 aic.football.it 
 
 

1983 births
Living people
People from Locri
Italian footballers
A.S.D. Martina Calcio 1947 players
Ascoli Calcio 1898 F.C. players
Pisa S.C. players
Cavese 1919 players
Serie B players
Serie C players
Serie D players
Association football midfielders
Footballers from Calabria
Sportspeople from the Metropolitan City of Reggio Calabria